The Andhra Pradesh Legislative Assembly election, 2014 took place on 30 April and 7 May 2014 to elect members to the legislatures of Telangana and Andhra Pradesh. It was held concurrently with the Indian general election. The results were declared on 16 May 2014. The Telugu Desam Party led by N. Chandrababu Naidu won a majority of the 175 seats in the rump Andhra Pradesh, while Telangana Rashtra Samithi led by K. Chandrashekar Rao won in the new state of Telangana.

Previous Assembly 
In the 2009 Andhra Pradesh Assembly election, Congress had taken the lead, winning 156 of the 294 seats in the Assembly. As the leader of the Congress Legislature Party, Y. S. Rajasekhara Reddy was invited to form the government by Governor N. D. Tiwari.

Unexpectedly, the Government lasted for 4 years 9 months, and the president rule was imposed later which expired on 30 May 2014. The Election Commission of India (ECI) decided to hold the Assembly elections along with the general election. The election in each Assembly constituency (AC) was held in the same phase as the election to the corresponding Parliamentary constituency that the AC falls under.

Background 

On 3 October 2013, the Union Cabinet of India approved the creation of the new State of Telangana. On 2 June 2014 the President of India, Pranab Mukherjee issued a gazette notification which formalised the separation of Telangana from Andhra Pradesh.

Schedule of election

Opinion polls

Andhra Pradesh

Telangana

Election day 
The election was held in two phases alongside the 7th and 8th phases of the General Election, taking place on 30 April in Telangana, and on 7 May in the remainder of Andhra Pradesh.

Despite few clashes between supporters of rival parties in Seemandhra and Rayalaseema, the poll percentage was good on the polling day. The initial poll percentage appeared to be dull, but it soon picked up as time went on. Chief Electoral Officer Bhanwar Lal told the media that he was confident that the percentage could be around 85–90% by the concluding time.

Phase 1 (Telangana) 
Polling passed off peacefully with more than 72% of more than 2.81 crore voters exercising their franchise in the 10 districts in the region. Chief Electoral Officer Bhanwarlal said the polling could touch 75 percent. In 2009, the percentage was 67.71 in the region.

Phase 2 (Andhra Pradesh) 
Chief Electoral Officer Bhanwarlal said around 76.80% of the 3.68 crore voters exercised their franchise across 175 Assembly and 25 Lok Sabha constituencies in the region and the voting percentage were seen as likely to touch 80%. The highest turnout of 82.97% was recorded in the Guntur district and the lowest of 70% in Vishakhapatnam district.

Results

United Andhra Pradesh

Andhra Pradesh

Results by party

Results by district

Results by constituency

Telangana

Results by party

Results by district

Results by constituency

See also 
 State Assembly elections in India, 2014
 List of constituencies of the Assembly of Andhra Pradesh
 2014 Andhra Pradesh General Election

References

External links 
 Chief Election Officer's website for General Elections 2014
 Elections commission – 2014 AP Assembly election results
 Elections commission – 2014 Parliament elections results

State Assembly elections in Andhra Pradesh
2010s in Andhra Pradesh
2014 State Assembly elections in India
April 2014 events in India
May 2014 events in India